Landolphia buchananii is a liana within the Apocynaceae family. It is sometimes called Nandi rubber in English and known locally as Mugu among Kikuyus. Occurs in  savannahs and montane forests in East Africa and Southeastern Nigeria.

Description 
As a climbing liana, it that can go as high as 40 meters and reach a diameter of 23 cm, occasionally, a sarmentose shrub, it can be capable of reaching 7 meters high;  its stem is dark brown with white latex. Coriaceous leaves and a glabrous or pilose petiole that is 1.5-8 mm long. Leaf blades are elliptic to obovate in outline, 1.9-14.5 cm long and 0.8-6 cm wide; leaflets are covered with minute or woolly hairs but can occasionally be glabrous. Terminal inflorescence, 2-20 flowered, composed of sepals that glabrous on the outside; fragrant flower with white, creamy or yellowish colored corolla and tubes that are sometimes green. Peduncle can be tendril like, curled or elongate and is 5-33 mm long, pedicel is 1.2-6.5 mm long. Fruit, 2-20 seeded is globular in form, usually green with white or light brown spots on it.

Distribution 
Occurs in West, Central and East Africa, from Nigeria in the west to Sudan in Central Africa and southwards to Zimbabwe.

Uses 
Ripe fruits are eaten by locals while stems are used in rope and basket making, root extracts are traditionally used to treat gonorrhea and bilharzia while leaf extracts are used to treat wounds.

References

Flora of Kenya
Flora of Zambia
Flora of Ethiopia
Rauvolfioideae